is the 8th single by the Japanese idol girl group HKT48. It was released on September 7, 2016. It was number-one on the Oricon Weekly Singles Chart on its release, selling 269,907 copies. As of September 26, 2016 (chart issue date), it had sold 283,726 copies. It was also number-one on the Billboard Japan Hot 100.

Full version music video, included only in limited editions, was released on YouTube on February 15, 2017 (except in countries which apply the YouTube Red).

Track listing

Type-A

Type-B

Type-C

Theater Edition

Weekly charts

Personnel

Saikō Kayo 
16 members were selected for this song. The choreographic center is Hana Matsuoka.

Yuriya Inoue, Aika Ōta, Yui Kōjina, Haruka Kodama, Rino Sashihara, Meru Tashima, Miku Tanaka, Yūka Tanaka, Mio Tomonaga, Mai Fuchigami, Natsumi Matsuoka, Hana Matsuoka, Sakura Miyawaki, Aoi Motomura, Madoka Moriyasu, Nako Yabuki

Soramimi Rock 
Sung by Team TII members.

Yume Hitotsu 
Sung by Chihiro Anai and her companies.

Yozora no Tsuki o Nomikomou 
Sung by Team H members.

Go Bananas! 
Sung by Team KIV members.

Onna no Ko Damon, Hashiranakya! 
Hana Matsuoka's solo song.

Further reading

References

External links
  

2016 singles
2016 songs
Japanese-language songs
HKT48 songs
Oricon Weekly number-one singles
Billboard Japan Hot 100 number-one singles